Waldemar, Valdemar or Woldemar is an Old High German given name. It consists of the elements wald- "power", "brightness" and -mar "fame".

The name is considered the equivalent of the Slavic name Vladimir, Volodymyr, Uladzimir or Włodzimierz.

The Old Norse form Valdamarr (also Valdarr)  occurs in the Guðrúnarkviða II as the name of a king of the Danes. The Old Norse form is also used in Heimskringla, in the story of Harald Hardrada, as the name of a ruler of Holmgard (Veliky Novgorod), in this case as a translation of the  Slavic name Volodimer. The Fagrskinna kings' sagas also have Valdamarr as the translation of Slavic Volodimer/Vladimir, in reference to both Vladimir the Great and Vladimir Yaroslavovich. The German form was introduced to Scandinavia as Valdemar  in the 12th century, with king Valdemar I of Denmark.

People with the name

Royalty
 Valdemar I of Denmark or Waldemar the Great (1131–1182), King of Denmark, one of the principal commanders of the Battle of Verchen and Battle of Grathe Heath
 Valdemar II of Denmark or Waldemar the Victorious (1170–1241), King of Denmark, one of the principal commanders of the Livonian Crusade
 Valdemar the Young (1209–1231)
 Valdemar III of Denmark (1314–1364)
 Waldemar I, Prince of Anhalt-Zerbst (died 1368)
 Waldemar II, Prince of Anhalt-Zerbst (died 1371)
 Valdemar IV of Denmark or Waldemar Otherday (c. 1320–1375)
 Waldemar III, Prince of Anhalt-Zerbst (died 1391)
 Valdemar, King of Sweden (1239–1302)
 Valdemar, Duke of Finland (c. 1282 – 1318)
 Valdemar of Denmark (bishop) (1157/1158–1235 or 1236)
 Prince Valdemar of Denmark (1858–1939)
 Waldemar, Margrave of Brandenburg-Stendal or Waldemar the Great (c.1280–1319)
 Prince Joachim Friedrich Ernst Waldemar of Prussia (1868–1879), son of Emperor Frederick III
 Prince Waldemar William Louis Frederick Victor of Prussia (1889–1945), son of Prince Henry and nephew of the previous
 Prince Waldemar of Schaumburg-Lippe (1940–2020), son of Prince Christian of Schaumburg-Lippe and Princess Feodora of Denmark, and the great-grandson of King Frederick VIII of Denmark
 Woldemar, Prince of Lippe (1824–1895)

Others

A–F
 Waldemar Ager (1869–1941), Norwegian-American newspaperman and author
 Waldemar Aspelin (1854–1923), Finnish architect
 Woldemar Bargiel (1828–1897), German composer
 Waldemar Bastos (1954–2020), Angolan musician
 Waldemar Baszanowski (1935–2011), Polish weightlifter
 Waldemar Bonsels (1880–1952), German writer
 Waldemar Caerel Hunter (1919–1968), Indonesian actor
 Waldemar Christofer Brøgger (geologist) (1851–1940), Norwegian geologist
 Waldemar Christofer Brøgger (writer) (1911–1991), Norwegian writer
 Valdemar Costa Neto (born 1949), Brazilian politician
 Waldemar Cierpinski (born 1950), East German athlete
 Waldemar Erfurth (1879–1971), German general

G–N
 Waldemar Haffkine (1860–1930), Ukrainian bacteriologist
 Woldemar Hägglund (1893–1963), Finnish major General during World War II, one of the principal commanders of the Battle of Kollaa
 Waldemar Hansteen (1857–1921), Norwegian architect
 Waldemar Hoven (1903–1948), German Nazi physician involved in Nazi euthanasia programs, executed for war crimes
 Waldemar Hvoslef (1825–1906), Norwegian Lutheran bishop.
 Waldemar Januszczak (born 1956), British art critic
 Woldemar Kernig (1840–1917), Russian and Baltic German internist and neurologist whose medical discoveries saved thousands of people with meningitis
 Waldemar Klingelhöfer (1900–1980), German Nazi SS-Sturmbannführer (Major) and convicted war criminal
 Waldemar Kophamel (1880–1934), German U-boat commanding officer in the Imperial German Navy during World War I
 Waldemar Legień (born 1963), Polish judoka
 Waldemar Lemos (born 1954), Brazilian football (soccer) manager
 Waldemar Levy Cardoso (1900–2009), field marshal of the Brazilian Army
 Waldemar Lindgren (1860–1939), Swedish-American geologist, one of the founders of modern economic geology
 Woldemar von Löwendal (1700–1755), German military officer and one of the principal commanders of the Battle of Fontenoy
 Waldemar Łysiak (born 1944), Polish writer
 Waldemar Maciszewski (1927–1956), Polish pianist and composer
 Waldemar Matuška (1932–2009), Czechoslovak singer
 Waldemar Milewicz (1956–2004), Polish journalist

N–Z
 Waldemar Olszewski (born 1931), Polish lymphologist
 Waldemar Pabst (1880–1970), German soldier and political activist, one of the principal commanders of the German Revolution of 1918–1919
 Waldemar Pawlak (born 1959), Polish politician
 Valdemar Poulsen (1869–1942), Danish inventor
 Waldemar Prusik (born 1961), Polish footballer
 Waldemar Sorychta (born 1967), German heavy metal musician and record producer
 Waldemar Starosta (born 1961), Polish politician
 Waldemar Thrane (1790–1828), Norwegian composer, violinist and conductor
 Waldemar Verner (1914–1982), chief of the People's Navy (Volksmarine) of the National People's Army of the German Democratic Republic 
 Waldemar Victorino (born 1952), Uruguayan football player
 Woldemar Voigt (1850–1919), German physician
 Waldemar Caerel Hunter (1919–1968), Indonesian actor
 Waldemar Witkowski (born 1953), Polish politician
 Waldemar Wilenius (1868–1940), Finnish architect
 Waldemar Young (1878–1938), American screenwriter

See also
 Valdemar (disambiguation)
 List of Danish monarchs
 List of Swedish monarchs

References

German masculine given names
Norwegian masculine given names
Polish masculine given names